Pseudotaxalus alboguttatus is a species of beetle in the family Cerambycidae. It was described by Stephan von Breuning in 1939.

References

Pteropliini
Beetles described in 1939